Annie Maude Blackett (30 July 1889–12 June 1956) was a New Zealand librarian. She was born in Newcastle upon Tyne, Northumberland, England, on 30 July 1889. She was one of the first Chief Librarians to be trained in New Zealand.

Blackett arrived in New Zealand around 1907, and became a library assistant at Canterbury Public Library in 1913.

She was appointed chief librarian at Wanganui Public Library in 1918.

She died in Wanganui on 12 June 1956.

References

1889 births
1956 deaths
New Zealand librarians
Women librarians
People from Christchurch
British emigrants to New Zealand
People from Newcastle upon Tyne